Dwight Walton (born March 23, 1965 in Montreal, Quebec) is a former basketball player from Canada, who played at Dawson College in Montreal with teammates Trevor C. Williams, Wayne Yearwood and Boyd Bailey. He later would go on to join the Canadian National Team.  

Before Dawson college, Dwight Walton play basketball at Wagar High School in Côte Saint-Luc, Quebec. After starring at Dawson College and receiving All-Canadian honours he went on to become an All-American at the Florida Institute of Technology (1991), an NCAA Division II basketball program, after starring at NCAA Division I Siena College.

In the 1988 Summer Olympics in Seoul, Korea, he played on the Canadian national team with longtime friend Wayne Yearwood, who is also from Montreal. He later went on to play with the Oklahoma City Cavalry in the Continental Basketball Association (CBA), and with the Montreal Dragons of the now defunct National Basketball League.  In 1993, he played basketball on the Canadian national team with a little-known 18-year-old from Victoria, British Columbia, by the name of Steve Nash, now an NBA Hall of Famer.

Walton went on to play professionally in Israel, France, and Switzerland before returning to Montreal to play for the Montreal Matrix of the American Basketball Association (ABA), during the 2005–2006 season.  While playing for the Matrix he simultaneously coached the Midget Boys basketball team at John F. Kennedy high school, located in the St. Michel district of east end Montreal. Currently Dwight is the assistant coach for Concordia University men's basketball team.

Dwight also serves as a regular NBA and NCAA basketball analyst on Montreal radio station TSN690. He does guest spots on the morning show, weekend shows and co-hosts NBA regular-season and playoff previews.

Dwight Walton was hired by TSN (The Sports Network) to provide colour commentating at the 2009 Canada Games.

See also
List of Montreal athletes
list of famous Montrealers

References

External links and Notes
https://web.archive.org/web/20060423162430/http://qball.ca/

1965 births
Living people
Anglophone Quebec people
Basketball players at the 1988 Summer Olympics
Black Canadian basketball players
Canadian basketball coaches
Canadian expatriate basketball people in the United States
Canadian expatriate basketball people in France
Canadian expatriate basketball people in Switzerland
Dawson College alumni
Dawson College coaches
Oklahoma City Cavalry players
Olympic basketball players of Canada
Siena Saints men's basketball players
Basketball players from Montreal
Florida Institute of Technology alumni
Canadian men's basketball players
1990 FIBA World Championship players
1994 FIBA World Championship players
Canadian expatriate basketball people in Israel